Micropteropus (dwarf epauletted bat) is a genus of bat in the family Pteropodidae. It contains the following species:
 Hayman's dwarf epauletted fruit bat, Micropteropus intermedius
 Peters's dwarf epauletted fruit bat, Micropteropus pusillus

References

 
Bat genera
Taxa named by Paul Matschie
Taxonomy articles created by Polbot